The Valea Neagră is a left tributary of the Crasna river. It originates in Romania near the village of Foieni, crosses into Hungary north of Urziceni and finally joins the Crasna near Mérk.

References

Rivers of Romania
Rivers of Hungary
Rivers of Satu Mare County
International rivers of Europe